Engineering optimization

 is the subject which uses optimization techniques to achieve design goals in engineering. It is sometimes referred to as design optimization.

Topics

 structural design (including pressure vessel design and welded beam design)
 shape optimization 
 topology optimization (including airfoils)
 inverse optimization (a subset of the inverse problem)
 processing planning
 product designs
 electromagnetic optimization
 space mapping
 aggressive space mapping
 yield-driven design
 optimization exploiting surrogates (surrogate model)

References 

Engineering concepts